White Oak, West Virginia may refer to:
White Oak, Raleigh County, West Virginia, an unincorporated community in Raleigh County
White Oak, Ritchie County, West Virginia, an unincorporated community in Ritchie County
White Oak, Upshur County, West Virginia, an unincorporated community in Upshur County